Tillandsia exserta is a species in the genus Tillandsia. This species is endemic to Mexico.

Cultivars
 Tillandsia 'Boreen'
 Tillandsia 'Brooyar'
 Tillandsia 'Cootharaba'
 Tillandsia 'Heather's Blush'

References

BSI Cultivar Registry Retrieved 11 October 2009

exserta
Endemic flora of Mexico